László Mihályfi (born 21 September 1939 in Mezőkeresztes) is a Hungarian former sprinter who competed in the 1964 Summer Olympics.

References

1939 births
Living people
Hungarian male sprinters
Olympic athletes of Hungary
Athletes (track and field) at the 1964 Summer Olympics
Universiade medalists in athletics (track and field)
Sportspeople from Borsod-Abaúj-Zemplén County
Universiade gold medalists for Hungary
Medalists at the 1961 Summer Universiade
Medalists at the 1963 Summer Universiade
Medalists at the 1965 Summer Universiade
20th-century Hungarian people
21st-century Hungarian people